Henriette Schneider (1747–1812) was a German painter.

Born in Neuwied, Schneider was the daughter of Ludwig Schneider. She produced portraits in pastel and enamel, and was proficient in miniature painting as well. She died in Munich.

References

1747 births
1812 deaths
German women painters
German portrait painters
18th-century German painters
18th-century German women artists
19th-century German painters
19th-century German women artists
Portrait miniaturists
Pastel artists
People from Neuwied